Lewis Wilson was an actor.

Lewis Wilson may also refer to:

Hack Wilson (Lewis Wilson),  American Major League Baseball player
Lewis Wilson (footballer)

See also
Louis Wilson (disambiguation)